Michael Herschel Greger (born 25 October 1972) is an American physician, author, and professional speaker on public health issues, best known for his advocacy of a whole-food, plant-based diet, and his opposition to animal-derived food products.

Career

Greger went to college at Cornell University School of Agriculture, where as a junior he wrote informally about the dangers of bovine spongiform encephalopathy, commonly known as mad cow disease, on a website he published in 1994. In the same year, he was hired to work on mad cow issues for Farm Sanctuary, near Cornell, and became a vegan after touring a stockyard as part of his work with Farm Sanctuary. In 1998, he appeared as an expert witness testifying about bovine spongiform encephalopathy when cattle producers unsuccessfully sued Oprah Winfrey for libel over statements she had made about the safety of meat in 1996.

He enrolled at Tufts University School of Medicine, originally for its MD/PhD program, but then withdrew from the dual-degree program to pursue only the medical degree. He graduated in 1999 as a general practitioner specializing in clinical nutrition. In 2001, he joined the Organic Consumers Association to work on mad cow issues, on which he spoke widely as cases of the disease appeared in the US and Canada, calling mad cow "The Plague of the 21st Century."

In 2004, he launched a website and published a book critical of the Atkins Diet and other low carb diets.

In 2004, the American College Of Lifestyle Medicine was formed in Loma Linda, and Greger was a founding member as one of the first hundred people to join the organization.

In 2005, he joined the farm animal welfare division of the Humane Society as director of public health and animal agriculture. In 2008, he testified before Congress after the Humane Society released its undercover video of the Westland Meat Packing Company, which showed downer animals entering the meat supply, and which led to the USDA forcing the recall of 143 million pounds of beef, some of which had been routed into the nation's school lunch program.

In 2011, he founded the website NutritionFacts.org with funding from the Jesse & Julie Rasch Foundation.

Greger is a Research Advisory Committee member of The Vegan Society.

Dietary recommendations

In his lectures, videos, and writings about nutrition, Greger tries to persuade people to change their eating habits from a Western pattern diet to a whole-food, plant-based diet, which he says can prevent and reverse many chronic diseases. He is critical of some other doctors for not encouraging their patients to adopt plant-based diets and to avoid animal-based products and has criticized the USDA, stating that "a conflict of interest right in their mission statement" protects the economic interests of food producers in lieu of clear dietary guidelines.

Reception
Greger's third book, Bird Flu: A Virus of Our Own Hatching, received a favorable review which said it was "interesting and informative to both scientists and lay persons", but public health expert David Sencer was critical of the book, writing that it "focuses heavily on doomsday scenarios and offers little in terms of practical advice to the public" and that "a professional audience would quickly put [the book] aside for more factually correct sources of information".

His fourth book, How Not to Die, made The New York Times Best Seller list at least three times. 

Harriet A. Hall has written that, while it is well-accepted that it is more healthy to eat a plant-based diet than a typical Western diet, Greger often overstates the known benefits of such a diet as well as the harm caused by eating animal products (for example, in a talk, he claimed that a single meal rich in animal products can "cripple" one's arteries), and he sometimes does not discuss evidence that contradicts his strong claims.

Joe Schwarcz of McGill University has commented that although Greger takes his information from respected science journals and produces impressive videos, he has a vegan agenda and is known for cherry picking of data.

Publications
 Heart Failure: Diary of a Third-Year Medical Student (2000)
 Carbophobia: The Scary Truth Behind America's Low Carb Craze (2005).
 Bird Flu: A Virus of Our Own Hatching (2007)
 How Not To Die: Discover the Foods Scientifically Proven to Prevent and Reverse Disease. Description & arrow/scrollable preview. (Hardcover) (2015) (with Gene Stone). A critique of the book is at "How Not to Die by Dr. Michael Greger: A Critical Review" by Denise Minger. 
The How Not to Die Cookbook: 100+ Recipes to Help Prevent and Reverse Disease (with Gene Stone & Robin Robertson) (Hardcover) (2018) 
How Not to Diet: The Groundbreaking Science of Healthy, Permanent Weight Loss (Hardcover) (2019) 
How to Survive a Pandemic (Paperback) (2020)

See also 
The Game Changers (2018), a documentary film that promotes a plant-based diet
Seaspiracy (2021), a documentary film about the environmental impact of fishing 
Veganism
What the Health (2017), a documentary film which critiques the health impact of meat, fish, eggs and dairy products consumption

References

External links 

1972 births
Living people
20th-century American physicians
American food writers
American founders
American nutritionists
American people of Jewish descent
American primary care physicians
American veganism activists
Cornell University College of Agriculture and Life Sciences alumni
Plant-based diet advocates
Tufts University School of Medicine alumni
Vegan cookbook writers